Daniel DiMaggio is an American actor. He played the role of Oliver Otto in the ABC sitcom American Housewife.

Early life 
DiMaggio was born to actor and writer Lou DiMaggio, and actress Loretta Fox. In his personal time, he enjoys skateboarding, running marathons and baseball.

Daniel participates in Disney's Magic of Storytelling campaign aimed to encourage children to read.

Career 
DiMaggio's first started acting in commercials at the age of 8. His first production role was in the short film Geisho in 2010. He guest starred on Burn Notice as a young Michael Westen. He was also featured as a young Superman in the series Supergirl in 2016. In 2017 he had a role in Daddy's Home 2 as Young Dusty.

In 2016, DiMaggio was cast as Oliver Otto, the middle child on the ABC family sitcom American Housewife. The show debuted on October 11, 2016, and ran for five seasons. He has listed "The Maze" as his favorite episode. As part of his role as Oliver Otto, DiMaggio has been studying ballet since the show debuted. With no previous training, he took several classes a week to build his ability to perform on the show.

In 2019, DiMaggio appeared on an episode of Celebrity Family Feud, with his American Housewife co-stars, taking on the cast of Descendants 3.

Filmography

Film

Television

References

External links 
 
 

Living people
American male ballet dancers
American male child actors
American male film actors
Place of birth missing (living people)
American male television actors
American male voice actors
Male actors from Los Angeles
Year of birth missing (living people)